Eralea is a genus of moths in the family Cosmopterigidae.

Species
Eralea abludo Hodges, 1978
Eralea albalineella (Chambers, 1878) (syn: Eralea striata Hodges, 1962)

References
Natural History Museum Lepidoptera genus database

Cosmopteriginae